Standon railway station served the village of Standon, Hertfordshire, England, from 1863 to 1965 on the Buntingford branch line.

History 
The station was opened on 3 July 1863 by the Great Eastern Railway. It was rebuilt in 1869 after a fire destroyed the wooden buildings. On the up side was the signal box which controlled the level crossing and three sidings which serve the goods yard on the down side. A private siding also served the nearby Standon Paper Mill. The station closed to passengers on 16 November 1964 and closed to goods on 20 September 1965.

References 

Disused railway stations in Hertfordshire
Former Great Eastern Railway stations
Railway stations in Great Britain opened in 1863
Railway stations in Great Britain closed in 1964
1863 establishments in England
1965 disestablishments in England
Beeching closures in England